Paczyna  (formerly German Gross Patschin) is a village in the administrative district of Gmina Toszek, within Gliwice County, Silesian Voivodeship, in southern Poland.

The village has a population of 1,251.

References

Paczyna